Sparganothis sullivani is a species of moth of the family Tortricidae. It is found in the United States in Florida, Louisiana, North Carolina and South Carolina.

The wingspan is 10–13 mm.

References

Moths described in 2012
Sparganothis